The Wailing Buddy Rich is an album by jazz drummer Buddy Rich, released in 1955 on Norgran Records.  The first two tracks were recorded on May 16, 1955, in New York; the remaining tracks were recorded with different personnel in Los Angeles on August 26.

Track listing
LP Side A
"The Monster"
"Sunday"
LP Side B
"Smooth One"
"Broadway"

Personnel
Side A
Thad Jones – trumpet
Joe Newman – trumpet
Ben Webster – tenor saxophone
Frank Wess – tenor saxophone
Oscar Peterson – piano
Freddie Green – guitar
Ray Brown – bass
Buddy Rich – drums
Side B 
Sonny Criss – alto saxophone
Harry Edison – trumpet
Jimmy Rowles – piano
John Simmons – bass
Buddy Rich – drums

References

Norgran MGN 1078
Verve MGV 8168

External links
The Wailing Buddy Rich at jazzdisco.org

1955 albums
Buddy Rich albums
Albums produced by Norman Granz
Norgran Records albums